Balsa is a village in Szabolcs-Szatmár-Bereg County, in the Northern Great Plain region of eastern Hungary.

In the 19th and 20th centuries, a small Jewish community lived in the village, in 1880 100 Jews lived in the village, most of whom were murdered in the Holocaust. The community had a Jewish cemetery.

References

Barabas